Tripoli is an unincorporated community in Lincoln and Oneida counties in the U.S. state of Wisconsin. Tripoli has a post office with ZIP code 54564.

Images

References

Unincorporated communities in Lincoln County, Wisconsin
Unincorporated communities in Oneida County, Wisconsin
Unincorporated communities in Wisconsin